Augyles is a genus of beetles belonging to the family Heteroceridae. The genus has an almost cosmopolitan distribution

Species
The following species are recognised in the genus Augyles:

Augyles aureolus 
Augyles auromicans
Augyles blanda 
Augyles cribratellus
Augyles davranogloui 
Augyles flavidus 
Augyles gravidus 
Augyles hispidulus 
Augyles intermedius 
Augyles letovi 
Augyles marmota 
Augyles niloticus
Augyles obliteratus 
Augyles pallens
Augyles pruinosus 
Augyles senescens 
Augyles sericans 
Augyles turanicus

References

Beetles